Battagram Tehsil is an administrative subdivision (Tehsil) of the Battagram District in the Khyber Pakhtunkhwa province of Pakistan. It serves as the Tehsil headquarters and covers a total area of 300 square miles (780 km2). Battagram Tehsil merged into Pakistan as an administrative region before being raised to the status of a district in 1993. On October 8, 2005, a 7.6 magnitude earthquake in Kashmir badly affected the area.

Overview and history
Battagram Tehsil is surrounded by Allai, Shangla, and Kohistan to the north and the east, and by the Kaghan Valley and Mansehra to the west. The mountain slopes at the eastern end are forested. The total area of Tehsil Battagram is about 300 square miles (780 km2). Wheat, barley, corn, and rice are grown in the area. Cis-Indus known as the Swatis comprise the dominant tribe. Khan culture is dominant in the Battagram Valley.

Historically, the Swatis of Hazara drove Hindus out of the upper Hazara, and then settled in Mansehra and Battagram. The valley was ruled by Khans (tribal rulers) until they signed the Instrument of Accession with Pakistan in 1949. Battagram Tehsil was later merged into Pakistan in 1971 as an administrative part of the Battagram sub-division. In 1993, Battagram was upgraded to the status of a district and Battagram became one of the Tehsil of Battagram district.

2005 earthquake
The Battagram (Tehsil) valley was badly affected by the 2005 Kashmir earthquake on October 8, 2005. More than 4,500 people were killed, and approximately 35,000 were seriously injured.

Administration
The city of Battagram serves as the Tehsil headquarters; Tehsil is subdivided into 12 Union Councils:

Population 
The population of Battagram Tehsil was 296,198, according to the 2007 Pakistan Census.

People 

The area is mainly inhabited by Pashto-speaking Pathan tribes, the Swati and Syed.   The Pashtun tribes are divided into many sub-tribes, including Khankhel, Ghouri Bhel (most living in Phagora village), Younas Khel, Khadar Khani, Arghoshal, Behram Khel, Raza Khani, Malakal, Mula Khel, Shams Khel, Deshan, Al-Sadatfamilies, Sahibzadgan, and Nikakhel Akhon Khail.

They have fought for the land in the past, but the fighting has ceased for the last decade. The people often solve their problems with Jirga system in villages.  People of Battagram do not have any external sources of income and mostly depend upon agriculture.

See also 
 Allai Tehsil
 Battagram District

References

Battagram District
Tehsils of Khyber Pakhtunkhwa